Claude Whittindale (1881 in Kenilworth, England – 10 February 1907 in Parkstone, England) was a British rugby union player who competed in the 1900 Summer Olympics. He was a member of the British rugby union team, which won the silver medal.

References

External links
 
 
 

1881 births
1907 deaths
British rugby union players
Rugby union players at the 1900 Summer Olympics
Olympic rugby union players of Great Britain
Olympic silver medallists for Great Britain
Medalists at the 1900 Summer Olympics
Date of birth missing
People from Kenilworth
Sportspeople from Warwickshire